Henning Elting (26 October 1925 – 8 May 2014) was a Danish footballer. He played in four matches for the Denmark national football team from 1949 to 1950.

References

External links
 
 

1925 births
2014 deaths
Danish men's footballers
Denmark international footballers
People from Guldborgsund Municipality
Association football goalkeepers
Boldklubben 1909 players
Køge Boldklub players